The Type 901 (NATO reporting name: Fuyu-class, also known as Hulunhu-class) is a class of fast combat support ship of the Chinese People's Liberation Army Navy.

Design
The Type 901 is estimated to have a 45,000 ton displacement and a beam of 31.5 metres. The ship is powered by four QC280 gas turbines, each delivering 28 MW, for maximum speed of about 25 kt; the speed is necessary to keep up with carriers. The Type 901 is more than twice the size of the preceding Type 903A and significantly faster.

Ships of the class

See also
 Type 905 replenishment tanker
 Type 908 replenishment ship

References

Auxiliary ships of the People's Liberation Army Navy
Auxiliary replenishment ship classes
Hulunhu-class fast combat support ships